Regis Samuel Baha (born 21 October 1996) is a Cameroonian footballer who plays for Serbian club FK Mladost Lučani.

Club career
Born in Yaoundé, after having had formation in Ismaco, he started playing at Unisport FC de Bafang in 2012 and in 2013 he became the youngest player of their senior team playing in the Cameroonian Elite One in 2013. He then spend 6 months at Renaissance FC de Ngoumou.

Then he moved abroad and signed with Tunisian side AS Marsa playing with them in the Tunisian Ligue Professionnelle 1 between 2014 and 2017. He arrived at Marsa as former Cameroonian cadet international and being only 17 and half years-old. His great performances soon granted him a change from shirt number 6 to number 10. However, AS Marsa ended relegated at the end of the 2016–17 season and, since leagues of the Magheb don't allow foreigners in the lower-levers, Marsa had to end contract with its best player.

In summer 2018, Baha moved to Europe, and had a successful trial that got him a contract with Serbian top-flight side FK Napredak Kruševac. He made his league debut on 29 July 2018, in the second round in an away game against FK Mačva Šabac.

International career
Baha was part of Cameroon side at the Montaigu Tournament in 2012.

References

1996 births
Living people
Footballers from Yaoundé
Cameroonian footballers
Cameroonian expatriate footballers
Association football midfielders
Unisport Bafang players
Renaissance FC de Ngoumou players
Elite One players
AS Marsa players
Tunisian Ligue Professionnelle 1 players
Expatriate footballers in Tunisia
FK Napredak Kruševac players
FK Mladost Lučani players
Serbian SuperLiga players
Expatriate footballers in Serbia